The 2020–21 FA Women's National League was the 29th season of the competition, and the third since a restructure and rebranding of the top four tiers of English football by The Football Association. Starting in 1992, it was previously known as the FA Women's Premier League. It sits at the third and fourth levels of the women's football pyramid, below the FA Women's Championship and above the eight regional football leagues.

The league featured six regional divisions: the Northern and Southern divisions at level three of the pyramid, and below those Division One North, Division One Midlands, Division One South East, and Division One South West. The league consisted of 71 teams, divided into six divisions of twelve teams apart from Division One South West which contains 11 teams. At the end of the season the winners of the Northern and Southern Premier divisions would have both qualified for a play-off match to decide the overall National League champion. Both teams were due be promoted to the FA Women's Championship.

On 4 January 2021, the National League was suspended due to the ongoing COVID-19 pandemic and national lockdown. On 15 March, all tiers of the National League were curtailed for a second consecutive season. Although there was no promotion and relegation between the tiers, including promotion from tier 3 into tier 2 and relegation from tier 6 into tier 7, an alternative method of upward club movement via application and based on set criteria was suggested in order to support the stability and integrity of the women's football pyramid. All clubs from tiers 3 to 6 were eligible to apply to move into the league immediately one tier above where they currently played with applications marked against a criterion weighted 75% on-field and 25% off-field. As a result, Sunderland and Watford were awarded promotion to the FA Women's Championship ahead of the 2021–22 season.

Premier Division

Northern Division 
Changes from last season:

 Following the curtailment of the 2019–20 season amid the COVID-19 pandemic in June 2020, it was decided there would be no promotion or relegation in the National League.

League table

Southern Division 
Changes from last season:

 Following the curtailment of the 2019–20 season amid the COVID-19 pandemic in June 2020, it was decided there would be no promotion or relegation in the National League. 
 Chichester City were renamed Chichester & Selsey Ladies after dropping their affiliation to Chichester City F.C.
 Gillingham L.F.C. were renamed Gillingham W.F.C. after losing their affiliation to Gillingham F.C. during a club restructure
 Yeovil Town rebranded Yeovil United

League table

Division One

Division One North 
Changes from last season:

 Following the curtailment of the 2019–20 season amid the COVID-19 pandemic in June 2020, it was decided there would be no promotion or relegation in the National League.
 Bolton Wanderers reverted to their original name of Bolton Ladies after dropping their affiliation to Bolton Wanderers F.C.

League table

Division One Midlands 
Changes from last season:

 Following the curtailment of the 2019–20 season amid the COVID-19 pandemic in June 2020, it was decided there would be no promotion or relegation in the National League.
 Birmingham & West Midlands were renamed Boldmere St. Michaels after merging with Boldmere St. Michaels F.C.
 Leicester United were renamed Holwell Sports after merging with Holwell Sports F.C.
 The New Saints (TNS) were renamed Wem Town after TNS announced the decision to fold their women's side and the team re-affiliated with Wem Town F.C.

League table

Division One South East 
Changes from last season:

 Following the curtailment of the 2019–20 season amid the COVID-19 pandemic in June 2020, it was decided there would be no promotion or relegation in the National League.
 AFC Basildon were renamed Hashtag United after merging with Hashtag United F.C.

League table

Division One South West 
Changes from last season:

 Following the curtailment of the 2019–20 season amid the COVID-19 pandemic in June 2020, it was decided there would be no promotion or relegation in the National League.

League table

See also
2020–21 FA Women's National League Cup
2020–21 FA Women's National League Plate
2020–21 FA WSL (tier 1)
2020–21 FA Women's Championship (tier 2)

References

External links 
 Official website of the FA Women's National League

FA Women's National League seasons
2020–21 in English women's football
FA Women's National League
FA Women's National League, 2020-21